NRU may refer to:
 National Register Of Unemployed
 Natural rate of unemployment
 National Reform Union (1864–1867), a political movements in the United Kingdom
 National Republic of Ukraine
 People's Movement of Ukraine (Народний Рух України, Narodnyi Rukh Ukrajiny)
 National Research Universal reactor
 Nauru, an island country (ISO 3166-1 alpha-3 code: NRU)
 Neighbourhood Renewal Unit, part of the Department for Communities and Local Government in the United Kingdom
 Nitrogen rejection unit
 Northeast Rugby Union
 Not recently used, a page replacement algorithm

See also
 Nru Nsukka, a town